Ioan Mire Melik, or Melic (born Iacob Ioan Miren Melik; August 9, 1840 – January 29, 1889), was a Wallachian, later Romanian mathematician, educator and political figure, one of the early members of Junimea literary society. Known for his work in private education, and for his tenure at the University of Iași, he was the author of several early introductions to science—dealing with arithmetic and geometry, but also with topography and surveying. He was perceived as a bland figure at Junimea meetings, and had little to do with its literary agenda, but took care of administrative chores and, for a while, of its publishing venture.

Taking his cue from the Junimist leadership, Melik followed the literary club as it transformed itself into a liberal conservative party. He represented Iași city in the Assembly of Deputies in the 1884 legislature, and then, under a Junimist government, helped enforce Titu Maiorescu's policies in the educational field. Melik is also remembered as an engineer and entrepreneur, who contributed to the modern history of Costeștii Botoșanilor village, his personal estate.

Biography

Early years
The future scientist was born in Bucharest, the Wallachian capital, on August 9, 1840 (although traditionally believed to have been born on August 15 or August 21, and wrongly credited in some documents as a "Iași native"). He was of Armenian origins: the Meliks traced their origin to Ohan, a Gregorian Armenian clergyman. I. M. Melik's parents were Ohan's son, Arakel "Popovici" Melik, and his wife Maria Gedik; they had two other children: Gavril, a boy, and Anika, a girl. Ohan's other son, Iacob Melic, was a successful architect. The Ottoman statesman Mustafa Reshid Pasha recommended his work to the Wallachian government, but Iacob left the country and settled in Paris. From his new home, Iacob Melik corresponded with the exiled leaders of the 1848 Revolution, in particular the moderate and pro-Ottoman faction of Ion Ghica, Alexandru G. Golescu and Nicolae Pleșoianu.

According to his own testimony, Ioan first attended the Armenian School in Bucharest's Yellow District, and then regular school in that same neighborhood. From 1854 to 1856, he completed secondary school at the Saint Sava College and was, in his own account, an award-winning student. From 1856, Iacob Melik took over the boy's education, taking him to Imperial France. Young Melik was tutored at a private boarding house (1857), before enlisting at the University of Paris Medical School, but changed his mind and applied for the École des Mines de Paris (1860). He finished school in 1864, and worked for a short while at salt mines in France and Belgium.

Melik's work took him to Moldavia, which, in 1859, had federated with Wallachia into the United Principalities. The regime of Domnitor Alexander John Cuza assigned him to inspect the Moldavian salt mines, at Slănic and Târgu Ocna. Known to his Iași colleagues and friends as Mirmilic, he began attending the Junimea club in 1865, being one of the outside sympathizers of the cause, and manifestly lacking literary ambitions. Iacob Negruzzi, the Junimea co-founder and biographer of its members, asserted: "[Melik was] once a passionate Junimist, but always kept silent." Negruzzi jokingly added that the standard estimate, according to which the maths teacher had uttered some 23 words at club meetings held between 1865 and 1880, was probably exaggerated in Melik's favor. Literary historian George Călinescu suggests that Melik, like astronomer Niculae Culianu or schoolteacher Pavel Paicu, only came to Junimea "out of devotion or for the sake of entertainment". The mathematician was notorious for not having published a single line in the Junimist tribune, Convorbiri Literare.

Junimist projects
With his Junimist credentials, Melik was made substitute Professor of Mathematics at Iași University (February 23, 1865). He acquired tenure in April 1866, shortly after Cuza's regime had been replaced by a Princely Lieutenancy. Soon after receiving this honor, Melik became a conservative ally of the Junimist Rector, Titu Maiorescu, helping him do battle with the University's well connected liberal club. As noted Călinescu, the University's Junimist circle was formed around Professors Melik, Culianu, I. Neguzzi, Ioan Caragiani and Nicolae Mandrea, with Junimea itself being "a political get-together with some cultural aspects."

Although still recognized as a secondary and inactive participant, Melik was involved on several early Junimist projects, and referred to by Maiorescu as the group's "banker". In addition to promoting Junimist goals at University, he participated in founding (and financing) the club's own private school, or "Academic Institute". He himself described the event as follows: "In summer 1866, I have founded the Academic Institute, in partnership with several colleagues, from both University and High School [that is, the National High School Iași]." Melik took personal care about furnishing the Institute, purchasing its books from prestigious companies such as Hachette, and keeping score of the more reliable publishing houses in Moldavia and Wallachia.

The institution itself left a mark on Romanian educational history, being seen as a model school in the field of private enterprise. It remains primarily noted for its contribution in Humanities, which were assigned to Maiorescu. Constantin Meissner, the dedicated student and future Junimist pedagogue, recalled: "we [students] found ourselves speaking, gesticulating, moving our heads just like our precious model [Maiorescu]." Another former student, and later teacher at the Institute, was scholar A. D. Xenopol. He describes his alma mater as "an eminent private school", and Melik as one of the "leading professorial forces" in Moldavia; he also credits Melik's "complete and measured exactitude" as influential for his own work ethic. According to Xenopol, Melik's refusal to tolerate staff truancy earned him a reputation as a strict colleague. Referencing an Armenian stereotype, the other Junimists began calling Melik a mindirigiu ("quilter") of their absences.

Melik was, with Vasile Pogor and Al. Farra, a manager of the literary club's own publishing company—a bankrupt project, since Pogor would only purchase books from his own area of interest. Before going down, this commercial branch of Junimea put out a number of general education works, including Melik's textbook Elemente de aritmetică ("Elements of Arithmetic"). Melik was also a cashier during Junimea anniversaries. Witnessing the decline of Junimist capital, he even proposed, unsuccessfully, that the club fortunes be invested in a salt mine. Melik was not dissuaded by the opposition, and continued to draft plans about investing Junimist money, forming a credit union, and opening up the Humpel girls' institute. His record of Junimea gains and expenses is seen by philologist Constantin Coroiu as evidence of Melik's "computer-like rigor". According to Negruzzi, Melik was an outstandingly passionate defender of Maiorescu's reputation. When the Junimist leader was framed a statutory rape scandal and taken to court, Melik provoked the judge to a duel, over not being allowed to enter the courthouse.

On February 18, 1867, the Junimist mathematician was also admitted into the conservative wing of Romanian Freemasonry, or "Star of Romania" Lodge. This branch of the Oriental Rite of Memphis and the Grand Orient de France, wherein Pogor himself had reached the 90th Degree, had for its Iorgu Sutzu as its Venerable Master, and came to include most of the Junimist notabilities. On October 21 of the same year, Melik was granted the Fellow Craft Rank in Masonic orders. Noting the role of Junimist Masons in combating the liberals' stated xenophobia, researcher Mihai Dim. Sturdza suggests that the "Star of Romania" was in fact "a place of refuge, [...] where the foreign-born intellectuals [...] created a bloc with the conservative boyars and the Jewish merchants". Their main liberal detractors included senior academic Simion Bărnuțiu and other outspoken antisemites.

Institutele-Unite and Assembly mandate
Melik's 1867 arithmetic course was highly popular, going through ten reprints. He followed up with other textbooks and introductory courses: Despre moneta română ("On the Romanian Currency", 1868); Elemente de Geometrie ("Elements of Geometry", 1869, ten reprints); Elemente de Topografie ("Elements of Topography", 1879, four reprints). From 1883 to 1888, Melik, Culianu and Constantin Climescu put out the magazine Recreații Științifice ("Scientific Recreations"), considered a direct precursor of the more prestigious Gazeta Matematică.

The author continued his work at the Institute before and after 1875, when it merged with the "New High School" into the private-run Institutele-Unite ("Unified Institutes"). That year, he also formalized his adoption by Iași city, by beginning construction work on a townhouse (completed 1882). The new Domnitor, Carol I, recognized Melik's educational merits by granting him the Benemerenti medal 1st class.

Shortly after the establishment of the Romanian Kingdom, Melik also made his way into the Junimist political party. Maiorescu, who led Junimea members in and out of the opposition Conservative Party, assigned him a place on the independent list for Iași in the election of 1884. In practice, Melik, Pogor, Negruzzi and others were in a cartel with the ruling National Liberals, and were elected deputies on a united pro-government list. A while after, with Premier Ion Brătianu ignoring repeated Junimist requests for cabinet positions, the entire faction moved back into the opposition.

Carol I, the newly crowned King of Romania, again rewarded Melik's services: in February 1884, Monitorul Oficial published news that the mathematician had been made Officer of the Order of the Star of Romania; when later errata informed Melik that he was merely a Knight of that company, he refused to accept the award altogether. Melik was still an active popularizer on scientific topics, publishing, in 1885, a surveying and ballistics tract: Equerulu grafometru sau quadrantulu de campania al D-lui Colonel de Artilerie A. Costiescu ("The Graphometer or Campaign Quadrant of the Artillery Colonel A. Costiescu"). In 1888, he issued three new textbooks: Arithmetic for 3rd- and 4th-graders, Geometry for the primary course, and a Curs practic de Geometrie elementară ("Practical Course in Elementary Geometry").

By then, I. M. Melik had invested his money into a large-scale agricultural venture, on the Moldavian estate of Costeștii Botoșanilor. The purchase took place in March 1885. As he himself noted, 507 fálce of land (some 726 hectares) were exchanged for his 210,000 lei, cash. This was a third of the estate, as defined by tradition, and a half of the actual village.

Final appointments, illness and death
In March 1888, after prolonged political infighting, Carol I turned his back on both the Conservatives and the National Liberals. The Junimists experienced a moment of triumph, with Theodor Rosetti as Premier and Maiorescu as Education Minister. For a while, Melik himself was Secretary General of the Education Ministry, his position at the University filled in by I. D. Rallet. The Junimist loyalist was assigned by Maiorescu to inspect the Moldavian schools. Their common goal was to purge from the schooling system a new political threat: socialist activists. Melik was ordered to work only with the known anti-socialists, and to sack all those suspected of having affiliated with the socialist clubs. In one such letter, the Minister instructs his subordinate to inquire about whether the known Marxist Ioan Nădejde still had relatives working on a state salary.

In early 1889, still active as General Inspector of the Schools and Principal of Institutele-Unite, Melik was struck down with a quickly progressing illness. His death, on January 29, was perceived as a tragedy by his fellow Junimists. Poet Anton Naum wrote, shortly after the events, "We have lost poor Melik in the space of 7 days, however good and healthy he had been. It left me with a hallowed heart, seeing that we were very close."

Melik's brief obituary in Familia magazine informed readers that the inspector's schoolbooks had "genuine value". Later, the post-Junimist historiographer I. E. Torouțiu presented Melik as a highly moral man of action: "He was one of the society's devoted members, without ever asking it for perks [or] advancements, even though he was in a position to demand them, under the governments of his political friends."

Melik was survived by his widow and their four children (four others had died in infancy). His son, Eugen I. Melik, who took over his papers, was known professionally as a Law Professor at the  University of Iași. Melik Jr also built the towering landmark of Costeștii Botoșanilor, a castle-shaped vacation home. One half of the village is commonly known as Costești-Melic.

Notes

References
George Călinescu, Istoria literaturii române de la origini pînă în prezent, Editura Minerva, Bucharest, 1986
 Nicolae Iorga, "Documente nouă de istorie românească", in Revista Istorică, Nr. 4–6/1922, pp. 81–95 (digitized by the Babeș-Bolyai University Transsylvanica Online Library)
Z. Ornea, Junimea și junimismul, Vol. I–II, Editura Minerva, Bucharest, 1998.  
Tudor Vianu, Scriitori români, Vol. II, Editura Minerva, Bucharest, 1971.  

19th-century Romanian mathematicians
Romanian mining engineers
Ballistics experts
Romanian surveyors
Romanian book publishers (people)
19th-century journalists
Male journalists
Romanian magazine editors
Romanian magazine founders
Romanian textbook writers
Heads of schools in Romania
Junimists
Members of the Chamber of Deputies (Romania)
Romanian civil servants
Scientists from Bucharest
Romanian people of Armenian descent
Armenian Apostolic Christians
Romanian Oriental Orthodox Christians
Saint Sava National College alumni
Mines Paris - PSL alumni
1840 births
1889 deaths
19th-century male writers
Academic staff of Alexandru Ioan Cuza University
Recipients of the Benemerenti medal